Jamal Dibi (born 5 December 1979 in Vlissingen, Netherlands) is a Dutch former footballer who played as a forward.

Career

In 2003, Dibi signed for [[AZ Alkmaar]|AZ]]. In 2008, he signed for Katwijk.Almere City. In 2010, he signed for In 2011, Dibi signed for Chabab. 

Back in 2013, Dibi had a trial with Indonesian side Persijap Jepara. However, he cut back on the deal six days later, citing familial reasons.

Contacted by a Singaporean agent in 2014, Dibi sealed a move to perpetual Maldivian Premier League title contenders New Radiant, with the option of a contract extension. In his first few games there, the Dutch forward recorded one goal and four assists, losing his first match to rivals Maziya S&RC 1-0. On the level of play in the island nation, the Vlissingen native stated that he was surprised by how physical it was.

References

External links 

 at Footballdatabase.eu

1979 births
Living people
Dutch expatriate footballers
Expatriate footballers in Morocco
Dutch sportspeople of Moroccan descent
Association football forwards
Eredivisie players
Dutch footballers
Expatriate footballers in the Maldives
Expatriate footballers in Malta
AZ Alkmaar players
Almere City FC players
Go Ahead Eagles players
FC Rijnvogels players
Sportspeople from Vlissingen
Footballers from Zeeland
Dutch expatriate sportspeople in Malta
Dutch expatriate sportspeople in Morocco
Dutch expatriate sportspeople in the Maldives
Dutch expatriate sportspeople in Qatar
Expatriate footballers in Qatar
Umm Salal SC players
Moghreb Tétouan players
Hibernians F.C. players
Mesaimeer SC players
New Radiant S.C. players
SC Telstar players
HFC Haarlem players
VV Katwijk players